Bathytoma paucispiralis is an extinct species of sea snail, a marine gastropod mollusk in the family Borsoniidae.

Distribution
This extinct marine species is endemic to New Zealand .

Description

References

 Maxwell, P.A. (2009). Cenozoic Mollusca. pp 232–254 in Gordon, D.P. (ed.) New Zealand inventory of biodiversity. Volume one. Kingdom Animalia: Radiata, Lophotrochozoa, Deuterostomia. Canterbury University Press, Christchurch. 
 Powell, Arthur William Baden. The New Zealand Recent and Fossil Mollusca of the Family Turridae: With General Notes on Turrid Nomenclature and Systematics. No. 2. Unity Press limited, printers, 1942.

paucispiralis
Gastropods of New Zealand